The Conductor, also known as Maestro, is an bronze sculpture of a conductor by Mike Larsen, installed in Oklahoma City's Bicentennial Park, outside Civic Center Music Hall, in the U.S. state of Oklahoma.

Description and history
The  statue depicts a man conducting and commemorates Joel Levine, music director of the Oklahoma City Philharmonic, as well as six music directors of other local orchestras: Ralph Rose, Victor Alessandro, Guy Fraser Harrison, Ray Luke, Ainslee Cox, and Luis Herrera de la Fuente. The artwork, unveiled in 2007, was funded by Jeannette and Dick Sias, with additional support from the city and the Oklahoma City Centennial Committee. Mayor Mick Cornett attended the dedication ceremony.

See also
 2007 in art

References

External links

 Orchestra Conductors – Bicentennial Plaza, OKC at Waymarking

2007 establishments in Oklahoma
2007 sculptures
Bronze sculptures in Oklahoma
Monuments and memorials in Oklahoma
Outdoor sculptures in Oklahoma City
Sculptures of men in Oklahoma
Statues in Oklahoma